Jan Pavlu (born 16 September 1994) is an Italian ice hockey player for the EV Landshut and the Italian national team. He was born in Italy to Czech parents: his father is Martin Pavlu and his grandfather is Jaroslav Pavlu, both former ice hockey players and national team members, for Italy and Czechoslovakia respectively.

He represented Italy at the 2019 IIHF World Championship.

References

External links

1994 births
EHC Bayreuth players
Heilbronner Falken players
Italian expatriate ice hockey people
Italian expatriate sportspeople in Germany
Germanophone Italian people
Italian people of Czech descent
Italian ice hockey defencemen
Living people
Ice hockey people from Bolzano